USS Clytie (AS-26) was an  in the United States Navy during World War II.

Construction
Clytie was launched 26 November 1943 by Ingalls Shipbuilding in Pascagoula, Mississippi, under a Maritime Commission contract, MC hull 861. Clytie was sponsored by Mrs. C. H. Leavitt; and transferred to the Navy 26 February 1944, and placed in temporary commission for passage to her conversion yard, Bethlehem Steel Corporation, Hoboken, New Jersey. Clytie was placed in full commission 18 January 1945.

Service history
Clytie sailed from New London 21 February 1945 for Brisbane, and Fremantle submarine base, Western Australia, where she tended submarines of the 7th Fleet from 4 April to 13 September. Returning to New London 17 October, Clytie remained there except for a brief overhaul at Philadelphia until placed out of commission in reserve 5 October 1946.

References

External links

 

Aegir-class submarine tenders
Submarine tenders
Submarine tenders of the United States Navy
United States Navy
Ships built in Pascagoula, Mississippi
1943 ships
World War II auxiliary ships of the United States